The Botswana ambassador in Washington, D. C. is the official representative of the Government of Botswana to the Government of the United States. The incumbent Botswana ambassador to the United States is David John Newman, who completed his assignment in July 2020. His successor, Onkokame Kitso Mokaila, presented his credentials to President Trump on 25 August 2020.

List of representatives

Botswana–United States relations

References 

 
United States
Botswana